The Corruption of Blood Act 1814 (54 Geo. 3 c. 145) was an Act of the Parliament of the United Kingdom of Great Britain and Ireland which abolished corruption of blood for all crimes except high treason, petty treason and murder. Corruption of blood had until then been an automatic consequence of attainder for treason and felony. (The Act did not apply to crimes committed before it was passed.) The Act was the result of the efforts of the law reformer Sir Samuel Romilly MP, who had failed to pass a similar bill in 1813.

Petty treason was abolished by the Offences against the Person Act 1828. Attainder for felony and treason (and therefore corruption of blood for murder and high treason) was abolished by the Forfeiture Act 1870.

Text
The Act consisted of a single clause, which read:
"[N]o attainder for felony which shall take place from and after the passing of this Act, save and except in cases of the crime of high treason, or of the crimes of petit treason or murder, or of abetting, procuring, or counselling the same, shall extend to the dis-inheriting of any heir, nor to the prejudice of the right or title of any person or persons other than the right or title of the offender or offenders during his, her, or their natural lives only; and that it shall be lawful to every person or persons, to whom the right or interest of any lands, tenements, or hereditaments after the death of any such offender or offenders should or might have appertained if no such attainder had been, to enter into the same."

References
Halsbury's Statutes of England (2nd ed.) Volume 5, London: Butterowrth & Co., 1948.
Hansard, 23 March 1814

United Kingdom Acts of Parliament 1814
English criminal law